Kimar may refer to:

Kimar (company), a subdivision of Chiappa Firearms
Kimar, Syria, a locality in northwest Syria